Lieutenant General Sir George Henry Fowke  (10 September 1864 – 8 February 1936) was a British Army general, who served on the staff of the British Expeditionary Force during the First World War.

Biography

Fowke joined the Royal Engineers as a lieutenant on 15 February 1884, and was promoted to captain on 19 July 1892. He saw active service in South Africa during the Second Boer War, where he was present at the Defence of Ladysmith, for which he was mentioned in despatches. During the war he received a brevet promotion to major on 29 November 1900, and was confirmed with the substantive rank of major on 22 February 1901. The war ended in June 1902 with the Peace of Vereeniging, and for his service he received a brevet promotion as lieutenant-colonel on 22 August 1902. After the end of the war, he stayed in South Africa and was appointed as Director of Public Works in the Transvaal and was a member of the Transvaal Legislative Council from 1902 to 1904. During the Russo-Japanese War he was an observer attached to the Japanese Army in Manchuria, and then lectured on fortifications at the School of Military Engineering. He was appointed the Assistant Adjutant General for the Royal Engineers in 1910, and then the Inspector of the Royal Engineers in 1913.

On the outbreak of the First World War, he was appointed to the post of Brigadier-General Royal Engineers in the BEF, the senior engineering advisor. As the war settled into a stalemate it became apparent that the Royal Engineers would play a significant role in trench warfare, and the position was changed to Chief Engineer and then to Engineer-in-Chief in 1915. It was in this position, that he agreed the formation of the Royal Engineer tunnelling companies, after a proposal from John Norton-Griffiths.

In  February 1916 he was promoted to hold the post of Adjutant-General of the Expeditionary Force. He held this post until the end of the war, and retired from the Army in 1922.

References

1864 births
1936 deaths
British Army personnel of the Second Boer War
British Army generals of World War I
Knights Commander of the Order of St Michael and St George
Knights Commander of the Order of the Bath
Royal Engineers officers
Tunnel warfare in World War I
Military personnel from Essex
British Army lieutenant generals